For better or worse, For better or for worse or For better, for worse may refer to:

 "For better for worse", a phrase from traditional English-language Christian marriage vows

Film
 For Better, for Worse (1919 film), an American silent film
 For Better, for Worse (1938 film), a Swedish film
 For Better, for Worse (1954 film), a British film
 For Better, for Worse (1959 film), a Hong Kong film
 Honeymoon Academy (film), also titled For Better or for Worse, a 1990 film
 For Better or For Worse (1975 film) (Pour le meilleur et pour le pire), a 1975 comedy film
 For Better or For Worse (1993 film), a 1993 documentary film
 For Better or Worse (film), a 1995 film

Music
 For Better, or Worse, an album by John Prine
 Mood Muzik 3: For Better or for Worse, an album by Joe Budden
 "For Better or Worse" (Debbie Gibson song)
 "For Better or Worse", a song from the Broadway play Jennie

Other
 For Better, for Worse (play), a comedy play by Arthur Watkyn
 For Better or For Worse, a comic strip by Lynn Johnston
 "For Better or Worse", a comic strip by Tad Dorgan
 For Better or Worse, a book by Jane Cunningham Croly
 For Better or Worse (1959 TV series), an American soap opera
 For Better or Worse (2011 TV series), an American television series
 For Better or Worse (radio series), a 1993–96 British radio series starring Gorden Kaye and Su Pollard

See also

 For Better, For Worse, Forever, a novel by Lurlene McDaniel